Early parliamentary elections were held in Peru on 26 January 2020. The elections were called after President Martín Vizcarra constitutionally dissolved the Congress of the Republic on 30 September 2019.

All 130 congressmen corresponding to the 26 electoral districts were elected to serve the remainder of the 2016–2021 congressional period. It was the seventh parliamentary election under the 1993 Constitution, which created the current Congress of the Republic.

Background 
On 30 September 2019, the President of the Council of Ministers, Salvador del Solar, set forth a vote of confidence before the Congress for refusing to pass a bill that modified the election process of judges of the Constitutional Court. The vote of confidence sought to stop the election of magistrates, modify the Organic Law of the Constitutional Court and the designation of the tribunes. However, the Plenary Session of Congress decided to continue with the election of magistrates, and ignored the vote of confidence presented by Del Solar. President Martín Vizcarra considered this a vote of no confidence in his Cabinet, and proceeded with the dissolution of Congress and the call for new elections according to Article 134 of the constitution: The President of the Republic is empowered to dissolve the Congress if it has censured or voted down two Councils of Ministers.

The decree of dissolution also called for new congressional elections to replace the existing congress. Under the law, elections are to be held within four months of the date of dissolution, without altering the pre-existing electoral system, and the Congress cannot be dissolved in the last year of the congressional term, which would be 2021. Once the Congress is dissolved, the Permanent Congressional Committee, which cannot be dissolved, remains in operation.

Schedule 
The schedule of activities of the congressional elections of Peru of 2020:

Electoral system 
The 130 members of Congress are elected in 26 multi-member constituencies using open list proportional representation. To enter Congress, parties must either cross the 5% electoral threshold at the national level, or win at least seven seats in one constituency. Seats are allocated using the D'Hondt method.

Opinion polls 
''The following graph shows the weighted polls', and does not include voting simulations

Voting simulations

Electoral polls

Results 

The election was the most divided in Peruvian history, with no party receiving more than 11% of the vote. The Fujimorist Popular Force, the largest party in the previous legislature, lost most of its seats, and the American Popular Revolutionary Alliance (APRA) had its worst ever election result, failing to win a seat for the first time since before the 1963 elections. Popular Action emerged as the largest party with 25 seats. New or previously minor parties such as Podemos Perú, the Purple Party and the Agricultural People's Front had good results. Contigo, the successor to former president Pedro Pablo Kuczynski's Peruvians for Change party, failed to win a seat and received only around 1% of the vote. The result was seen as representative of public support for president Martín Vizcarra's anti-corruption reform proposals.

Notes

References 

Peru
2020 in Peru
Elections in Peru
January 2020 events in Peru